Eleasalo Va'alele "Salo" Ale is an American Samoan attorney serving as the tenth lieutenant governor of American Samoa, since 2021. He previously served as Attorney General of American Samoa from 2014 to 2020. On January 13, 2020, Ale resigned as attorney general to pursue politics.

Early life and education 
Ale was born in American Samoa and attended Marist Brothers High School. He left American Samoa to earn a Bachelor of Arts degree from Truman State University in Missouri and a Juris Doctor from the Drake University Law School in Iowa.

Career 
After earning his undergraduate degree, Ale worked as a legislative assistant to then-U.S. Senator Daniel Inouye. After law school, he served as a clerk for Judge James Burns on the Hawaii Intermediate Court of Appeals. For 17 years, Ale worked as an attorney at Faegre Baker Daniels in Minneapolis. Ale was nominated to serve as the 10th Attorney General of American Samoa in 2014 by then-Governor Lolo Matalasi Moliga.

As Attorney General, he and a bipartisan group of attorneys general supported the 2019 extension of the Autism CARES Act of 2014. He joined another bipartisan group of attorneys general supporting the Ending Forced Arbitration of Sexual Harassment Act of 2017.

He resigned from his position in 2020, citing an interest in seeking another elective office. Ale and Mauga placed first in the November general election. Ale assumed office as Lieutenant Governor on January 3, 2021.

Ale serves as the chair of the task force countering the COVID-19 pandemic in American Samoa.

References 

|-

 

 

21st-century American politicians
American Samoa Democrats
American Samoan Attorneys General
American Samoan politicians
Lieutenant Governors of American Samoa
Living people
Truman State University alumni
Year of birth missing (living people)
Drake University Law School alumni